Peter Jeofry Searle Courtenay (11 March 1914 – 7 April 1959) played first-class cricket for Somerset in two matches in the 1934 season. He was born at Weymouth in Dorset and died at Broadstone, also in Dorset. His younger brother Geofry also played for Somerset.

Educated at Marlborough College, Courtenay played as a lower-order right-handed batsman in two matches inside a week for Somerset, but was not successful, failing to reach double figures in any of his four first-class innings.

In the Second World War, he is recorded in the London Gazette as being commissioned as a 2nd Lieutenant in the Army in Burma Reserve of Officers (ABRO).

References

1914 births
1959 deaths
English cricketers
Somerset cricketers
People educated at Marlborough College